Buckhurst Hill West is an electoral ward in Epping Forest, UK and is one of two wards that represent Buckhurst Hill.

Buskhurst Hill West has three seats in the District Council:

 Seat 1: last vote 2006 / 2010 next vote
 Seat 2: last vote 2003 / 2007 next vote
 Seat 3: last vote 2004 / 2008 next vote

2006 Local Election

Seat 1

Seat 3 (early election)

2004 Local Election: Seat 3

2003 Local Election: Seat 2

See also
Buckhurst Hill East

Wards of Epping Forest District